The Niagara Rainbow, known as the Empire State Express before 1976, was an American passenger train service operated by Amtrak between New York City and Detroit via Buffalo and Southwestern Ontario in Canada. The service ran between October 31, 1974, and January 31, 1979.

History
Prior to the formation of Amtrak in 1971, the Penn Central's Wolverine and Motor City Special had served the route, but Amtrak had truncated the Wolverine to Detroit and discontinued the Motor City Special.

The Empire State Express, as it was then known, made its first run to Detroit on October 31, 1974. Before that it was one of the trains on the Empire Corridor, making a daily run between New York's Grand Central Terminal and Buffalo. The states of New York and Michigan provided the funds to extend the train through to Detroit. A day train, the Empire State Express carried no sleeping accommodations, but did run with a baggage car and diner. At Buffalo, passengers could connect with a Penn Central/Toronto, Hamilton and Buffalo Railway/Canadian Pacific Railway service to Toronto.

Amtrak changed the name of the train to Niagara Rainbow on April 25, 1976, although Niagara Falls itself continued to be served by a bus connection. In 1978, several state governments proposed replacing the Niagara Rainbow and its Chicago—Cleveland—New York counterpart, the Lake Shore Limited, with a single train. The proposed service would have separate sections via Detroit and Cleveland west of Buffalo plus separate Boston and New York sections east of Albany. That plan was not implemented and the two trains remained separate. In October 1978 the Niagara Rainbow finally began stopping in Niagara Falls. Unlike the modern Maple Leaf which uses the Whirlpool Rapids Bridge to cross into Canada, the Niagara Rainbow used the Michigan Central Railway Bridge. From Canada the route travelled north then southwest using trackage from Canada Southern Railway with the stops at St. Thomas, Ontario  and Windsor, Ontario before crossing the border again into Detroit.

Amtrak truncated the Niagara Rainbow to Niagara Falls on January 31, 1979, after Michigan and New York withdrew their support. The United States Secretary of Transportation, Brock Adams, proposed re-routing the Lake Shore Limited, which ran through Cleveland on the opposite side of Lake Erie, over the Ontario route but this plan was not adopted by Congress.

Amtrak also ran an overnight service between New York and Toronto, also named the Niagara Rainbow, from June 1994 to September 10, 1995. It operated as a once-weekly additional frequency of the Maple Leaf, departing New York on Friday night and returning on Monday morning.

In March 2019, Amtrak indicated interest in 'restoration' of a Detroit-Toronto service in its FY 2020 funding request.

References 

Former Amtrak routes
International named passenger trains
Named passenger trains of Canada
Named passenger trains of Ontario
Passenger rail transportation in Michigan
Passenger rail transportation in New York (state)
Railway services introduced in 1974
Railway services discontinued in 1979
Proposed Amtrak routes